The New York Press Club, sometimes NYPC, is a private nonprofit membership organization which promotes journalism in the New York City metropolitan area. It is unaffiliated with any government organization and abstains from politics. While the club is headquarters in New York City, it serves as an association for journalists based in the United States.

History

The organization in differing forms has been around since the nineteenth century. In 1887, its members erected a 38-foot obelisk to mark the gravesite of a deceased reporter. But during the Great Depression in the United States, the organization fell apart. A revitalized organization was founded in 1948 as the New York Newspaper Reporters Association, and its name was changed to its current one in 1972.

Activities
In conjunction with its foundation, New York Press Club Foundation, the club focuses on furthering the interests of journalists and media people. It sponsors lectures and presentations relevant to journalism such as press freedom, investigative reporting, the relationship between the media and the government, the role of community newspapers, changes in media, topics in the news, foreign press coverage of New York, and questions about how the press covers itself. For example, it spurred discussion on the subject of concussions in American football. It sponsors debates among candidates for public office, provides support for journalists faced with media-related legal issues, and works with government agencies on issues such as issuing press credentials. For example, when New York mayor Bill De Blasio called for a closed-down session to exclude reporters, the Press Club's president Larry Seary criticized the decision, arguing for greater transparency. It sponsors an annual Conference on Journalism which is held at New York University, and it  used to publish Byline Magazine which features topics of interest to journalists. When prominent newspeople die, the organization issues statements about their contributions; for example, when news reporter Gabe Pressman died in 2017, the club issued a statement that Pressman "fought ferociously for journalists' rights".

The organization promotes the freedom of the press. It has criticized decisions to shut down news sites. When U.S. Attorney Jeff Sessions vowed to review "media subpoenas" as an attempt to quell leaks in government, the club criticized the remarks as "a not-so-veiled shot across the bow at the news media" and suggested that journalists must not be intimidated by such threats. When CNN journalist Jim Acosta was singled out by then president-elect Donald Trump during a press conference, in which the reporter's questions went unanswered, the club wrote a letter to Trump in Acosta's defense.

The current president is Jane Tillman Irving, who took office in 2018; she is retired from WCBS NewsRadio. The foundation also offers scholarships to local journalism students.

Award programs

Awards are given in categories such as writing, editing, and video production. Its awards are often cited by publishers and newspapers and reporters. They include:

 Gold Keyboard Award for excellence in investigative journalism. This award has been described as the association's most prestigious award. Typically the organization gives out the awards at an annual dinner in June.
 The Reverend Mychal Judge Heart of New York Award for reporting about New York City.
 The Nellie Bly Cub Reporter Award, given to reporters with less than three years of experience. This award has been given annually since 1978; past recipients include investigative journalists such as Mina Kimes and Jonathan Kanterman. The award was named after crusading journalist Nellie Bly, who was employed by Joseph Pulitzer in the 1890s who, according to one account, went to great lengths to get material for her stories; for example, she got herself committed to an insane asylum for ten days in order to report on what happened within the institution. H. Claire Brown is another recipient of the Nellie Bly award.
 The New York Journalism Hall of Fame Award for journalists whose careers in New York media characterized by long tenure, integrity and achievement. 
 The New York Press Club President's Award in recognition of careers which have had a salutary impact on journalism.

Past presidents

References

External links 

Coalition for the First Amendment
Awards for Journalism
Special Awards for Journalism
Photo/video gallery of recent events

American press clubs
Clubs and societies in New York City
Mass media in New York City